Matthias Versluis (born 18 July 1994) is a Finnish figure skater. Competing in ice dancing with Juulia Turkkila, he is the 2023 European bronze medalist, 2022 Grand Prix of Espoo bronze medalist and a three-time Finnish national champion.

As a single skater, he is the 2014 Finnish national champion and competed in the final segment at two ISU Championships.

Personal life
Versluis was born on 18 July 1994 in Genolier, Switzerland, to a Finnish mother and Dutch father. He moved to Finland with his family when he was six months old. As of 2018, he is studying physiotherapy.

Career

Early career 
Versluis began learning to skate in 2002. Tiiu Valgemäe coached him early in his career. In 2008, he debuted on the ISU Junior Grand Prix series, coached by Virpi Horttana, Sara Lindroos, and Arja Veijola. He competed at the 2012 and 2013 World Junior Championships, qualifying for the free skate at both events.

In December 2013, Versluis won the senior men's title at the 2014 Finnish Championships. He was selected to compete at the 2014 European Championships but withdrew due to a knee injury, sustained in training on 9 January 2014. His coaches were Virpi Horttana, Kati Perokorpi, and Henna Hietala. By 2015, he was being coached by Stefan Zins.

On 1 April 2016, the Finnish Figure Skating Association reported that Versluis had teamed up with Juulia Turkkila to compete in ice dancing.

2016–2017 season: Debut of Turkkila/Versluis
Making their international debut, Turkkila/Versluis placed sixth at the NRW Trophy in November 2016. Later that month, they finished 13th at their first ISU Challenger Series assignment, the 2016 CS Tallinn Trophy. In December, they took the silver medal behind Törn/Partanen at the 2017 Finnish Championships. In February, they represented Finland at the 2017 Winter Universiade, finishing eighth.

2017–2018 season
Turkkila/Versluis competed at a pair of Challenger Series competitions – placing tenth at the 2017 CS Lombardia Trophy, and fifteenth at the 2017 CS Finlandia Trophy – and then finished thirteenth at the International Cup of Nice. In November, they won bronze at the Ice Challenge in Austria. In December, they repeated as national silver medalists, again finishing second to Törn/Partanen.

2018–2019 season: First national title and Worlds debut
Turkkila/Versluis began their season with three Challenger Series events – they finished sixth at the 2018 CS Lombardia Trophy, seventh at the 2018 CS Ondrej Nepela Trophy, and sixth at the 2018 CS Finlandia Trophy. In October, the duo won silver at the Minsk-Arena Ice Star. In November, they debuted on the Grand Prix series, placing sixth at the 2018 Grand Prix of Helsinki, and then took bronze at the Warsaw Cup. The following month, they became the Finnish national champions and were selected to compete at the 2019 European Championships in Minsk, Belarus, where they placed eleventh. They then competed at their first World Championships, placing sixteenth.

2019–2020 season
Turkkila sustained a neck injury in a practice session at the 2019 CS Lombardia Trophy, compelling the team to withdraw from the competition. They subsequently also withdrew from the 2019 CS Finlandia Trophy and the 2019 Rostelecom Cup, their Grand Prix assignment for the year.  They were assigned to compete at the World Championships in Montreal, but these were cancelled as a result of the coronavirus pandemic.

2020–2021 season
Returning to competition for the first time in two years, Turkkila/Versluis represented Finland at the 2021 World Championships in Stockholm, placing twenty-first after a fluke error on the rotational lift.

2021–2022 season: Beijing Olympics
Turkkila/Versluis began the Olympic season at the 2021 CS Lombardia Trophy, where they placed sixth. They were assigned to the 2021 CS Nebelhorn Trophy, seeing to qualify a place for Finland at the 2022 Winter Olympics. They placed first in both programs, setting three new personal bests to take both their first Challenger gold and the first of four available dance spots. At their third Challenger event of the season, the 2021 CS Finlandia Trophy, Turkkila/Versluis came sixth, notably managing fourth place in the free dance. They competed at the 2021 Cup of Nice, also known as Trophée Métropole Nice, where they won gold, before going on to make their Grand Prix appearance at the 2021 Internationaux de France, where they finished in seventh.

After winning their second Finnish national title, Turkkila/Versluis were named to the Finnish Olympic team. Turkkila had a mild case of COVID-19 in late December and recovered, but because she continued to test positive, the team was unable to participate in the 2022 European Championships.

Making their appearance at the Beijing Olympics dance event, Turkkila/Versluis were the first Finnish ice dancers to appear in the Winter Olympics since Rahkamo/Kokko in 1994. They placed sixteenth in the rhythm dance, qualifying for the free dance. They moved up one place in the free dance, finishing fifteenth.

Turkkila and Versluis concluded the season at the 2022 World Championships, held in Montpellier. They finished twelfth.

2022–2023 season: Grand Prix and European medals 
Turkkila/Versluis won the bronze medal at the 2022 CS Finlandia Trophy before taking the gold medal at the 2022 Cup of Nice. They were considered medal contenders going into the Grand Prix, but placed eighth in the rhythm dance after Turkkila fell during the twizzle sequence. They were fifth in the free dance, rising to seventh overall. Their second event was the 2022 Grand Prix of Espoo, held on home ice in Finland instead of the Rostelecom Cup as a result of the Russo-Ukrainian War. They finished fourth in the rhythm dance with a new personal best score of 75.06, 1.16 points behind third-place Americans Carreira/Ponomarenko. In the free dance, they rose to third overall with another new personal best (116.73), taking the bronze medal with a total score of 191.79. They were the lone Finnish medalists at the Finnish Grand Prix event and the first Finnish dance team to ever medal in the Grand Prix. Turkkila said that the result "gives us a lot of confidence. We know what we are capable of, and we want to achieve more. This is just the beginning."

After winning their third Finnish national title, Turkkila/Versluis were their country's primary medal hope at a home European Championships, hosted, like the Grand Prix, in Espoo. This was their first appearance at the European Championships since 2019. They finished third in the rhythm dance with a new personal best score of 77.56, 0.23 points ahead of fourth-place Lithuanian team Reed/Ambrulevičius. In the free dance, Turkkila/Versluis set new personal bests in that segment and overall, and won the bronze medal. This was the first European medal for a Finnish dance team since Rahkamo/Kokko's gold in 1995. Versluis called it "absolutely amazing," especially in light of their previous absences.

Programs

Ice dancing with Turkkila

Single skating

Competitive highlights 
GP: Grand Prix; CS: Challenger Series; JGP: Junior Grand Prix

Ice dancing with Turkkila

Single skating

References

External links 

 
 
 Matthias Versluis at Tracings

1994 births
Living people
People from Nyon District
Finnish male single skaters
Finnish male ice dancers
Swiss male single skaters
Finnish people of Dutch descent
Swiss people of Finnish descent
Swiss people of Dutch descent
Competitors at the 2017 Winter Universiade
Competitors at the 2019 Winter Universiade
Figure skaters at the 2022 Winter Olympics
Olympic figure skaters of Finland
Sportspeople from the canton of Vaud